All or Nothing is a brand of sports documentary series distributed on the Amazon Prime Video platform. Produced by Amazon Studios, each season has covered a professional sports club or national team. Debuting in 2016 with All or Nothing: A Season with the Arizona Cardinals, the series films the operations, practices, and competitions of teams, players, and coaches. Other teams covered include the Dallas Cowboys, Carolina Panthers, Philadelphia Eagles, Los Angeles Rams, New Zealand national rugby union team, Toronto Maple Leafs, Brazil national football team, Manchester City, Tottenham Hotspur, Juventus, and Arsenal.

Seasons

American football

National Football League
All or Nothing: A Season with the Arizona Cardinals (2016)
All or Nothing: A Season with the Los Angeles Rams (2017)
All or Nothing: A Season with the Dallas Cowboys (2018)
All or Nothing: A Season with the Carolina Panthers (2019)
All or Nothing: A Season with the Philadelphia Eagles (2020)

College football
All or Nothing: The Michigan Wolverines (2018)

Association football

National teams
All or Nothing: Brazil National Team (2020)
All or Nothing: Germany National Team (2023)

Premier League
All or Nothing: Manchester City (2018)
All or Nothing: Tottenham Hotspur (2020)
All or Nothing: Arsenal (2022)

Serie A
All or Nothing: Juventus (2021)

Rugby union
All or Nothing: New Zealand All Blacks (2018)

Ice hockey
All or Nothing: Toronto Maple Leafs (2021)

See also
Hard Knocks (2001 TV series)

References

Amazon Prime Video original programming
Television series by Amazon Studios